Lanrivoaré is a commune in the Finistère department of Brittany in north-western France.

Population
Inhabitants of Lanrivoaré are called in French Lanrivoaréens.

See also
Communes of the Finistère department

References

External links

Official website 

Mayors of Finistère Association 

Communes of Finistère